The marine molluscs of Slovenia are a part of the molluscan fauna of Slovenia (wildlife of Slovenia). A number of species of marine molluscs are found in the wild in Slovenia.

Lipej et al. reported 70 species of opisthobranchs from Slovenia in 2012.
Zenetos et al. reported 74 species of opisthobranchs from Slovenia in 2016.

Summary table of number of species

Polyplacophorans

Marine gastropods 

Acteonidae
 Acteon tornatilis (Linnaeus, 1758)

Ringiculidae
 Ringicula auriculata (Ménard de la Groye, 1811)

Bullidae
 Bulla striata Bruguière, 1792

Haminoeidae
 Haminoea hydatis (Linnaeus, 1758)
 Haminoea navicula (da Costa, 1778)
 Atys jeffreysi (Weinkauff, 1866)
 Weinkauffia turgidula (Forbes, 1844)

Philinidae
 Philine catena (Montagu, 1803)
 Philine quadripartita Ascanius, 1772 - It was listed as Philine aperta (Linnaeus, 1767) by Lipej et al. in 2008. However Philine aperta (Linnaeus, 1767) sensu Jeffreys, 1867 is a synonym of Philine quadripartita because of misidentification.

Aglajidae
 Philinopsis depicta (Renier, 1807)

Cylichnidae
 Cylichna cylindracea (Pennant, 1777)

Scaphandridae
 Scaphander lignarius (Linnaeus, 1758)

Retusidae
 Retusa laevisculpta (Granata-Grillo, 1877)
 Retusa mammillata (Philippi, 1836)
 Retusa multiquadrata Oberling, 1970 - nomen dubium
 Retusa truncatula (Bruguière, 1792)
 Retusa umbilicata (Montagu, 1803)

Rhizoridae
 Volvulella acuminata (Bruguière, 1792)

Runcinidae
 Runcina adriatica T. Thompson, 1980

Creseidae
 Creseis clava Rang, 1828

Plakobranchidae
 Elysia gordanae Thompson & Jaklin, 1988
 Elysia timida (Risso, 1818)
 Elysia viridis (Montagu, 1804)
 Thuridilla hopei (Vérany, 1853)

Boselliidae
 Bosellia mimetica Trinchese, 1891

Limapontiidae
 Calliopaea bellula d’Orbigny, 1837
 Ercolania coerulea Trinchese, 1892

Tylodinidae
 Tylodina perversa (Gmelin, 1791)

Akeridae
 Akera bullata O. F. Müller, 1776

Aplysiidae
 Aplysia depilans Gmelin, 1791
 Aplysia fasciata Poiret, 1789
 Aplysia punctata (Cuvier, 1803)
 Bursatella leachii Blainville, 1817

Pleurobranchidae
 Berthella ocellata (delle Chiaje, 1830)
 Berthella stellata (Risso, 1826)
 Pleurobranchaea meckeli (Blainville, 1825)

Dorididae
 Doris bertheloti (d’Orbigny, 1839)
 Doris pseudoargus Rapp, 1827

Discodorididae
 Geitodoris planata (Alder & Hancock, 1846)
 Jorunna tomentosa (Cuvier, 1804)
 Platydoris argo (Linnaeus, 1767)
 Rostanga rosi (Ortea, 1979)
 Rostanga rubra (Risso, 1818)
 Thordisa filix Pruvot-Fol, 1951

Chromodorididae
 Felimare orsinii (Vérany, 1846)
 Felimare tricolor (Cantraine, 1835)
 Felimare villafranca (Risso, 1818)
 Felimida krohni (Vérany, 1846)
 Felimida luteorosea (Rapp, 1827)
 Felimida purpurea (Risso in Guérin, 1831)

Dendrodorididae
 Dendrodoris grandiflora (Rapp, 1827)
 Dendrodoris limbata (Cuvier, 1804)

Onchidorididae
 Onchidoris neapolitana (delle Chiaje, 1841)

Goniodorididae
 ...

Proctonotidae
 Janolus cristatus (Delle Chiaje, 1841)

Eubranchidae
 Eubranchus tricolor Forbes, 1838

Facelinidae
 Dicata odhneri Schmekel, 1967

Flabellinidae
 Cumanotus beaumonti (Eliot, 1906)

Species removed from the faunal list:
 Retusa obtusa (Montagu, 1803) - It was listed from Slovenia by De Min & Vio in 1997, probably based on misidentification. It is not listed by other authors.

Marine bivalves

Scaphopods

Cephalopods

See also
 List of non-marine molluscs of Slovenia

Lists of molluscs of surrounding countries:
 List of marine molluscs of Croatia
 List of marine molluscs of Italy

References

Slovenia
Slovenia